Digital renminbi (also abbreviated as digital RMB and e-CNY), or Digital Currency Electronic Payment (DCEP), is a central bank digital currency issued by China's central bank, the People's Bank of China. It is the first digital currency to be issued by a major economy, undergoing public testing as of April 2021. The digital RMB is legal tender and has equivalent value with other forms of renminbi, also known as the Chinese yuan (CNY), such as bills and coins.

The digital yuan is designed to move instantaneously in both domestic and international transactions. It aims to be cheaper and faster than existing financial transactions. The technology enables transactions to take place between two offline devices.

The digital renminbi is seen by some commentators as a form of Chinese government surveillance and control over users and their financial transactions.

History 

China's central bank, the People's Bank of China (PBOC), began research on the digital currency in 2014 under the leadership of Governor Zhou Xiaochuan. In 2016, Fan Yifei, a deputy governor of the PBOC, wrote that "the conditions are ripe for digital currencies, which can reduce operating costs, increase efficiency and enable a wide range of new applications". According to Fan, the best way to take advantage of the situation is for central banks to take the lead, both in supervising private digital currencies and in developing digital legal tender of their own.

In 2017, the State Council approved the development of the digital RMB, in partnership with commercial banks and other organizations. Chinese technology firms such as Alibaba (through its affiliate Ant Group), Tencent (which owns WeChat), Huawei, JD.com and UnionPay were invited to cooperate with the central bank in developing and testing digital RMB.

Testing 
In October 2019, the PBOC announced that a digital renminbi would be released after years of preparation. The version of the currency, known as DCEP (Digital Currency Electronic Payment), requires an account with a commercial bank, but may be "decoupled" from the banking system in the future, allowing tourists to gain access to the system.

In April 2020, testing began in four cities around China (Shenzhen, Suzhou, Chengdu and Xiong'an) to improve the currency's functionality. Areas of testing include the currency's reliability, stability, ease of use, and regulatory concerns such as the prevention of money laundering, tax evasion and terror financing. The currency could be transferred to bank accounts or used directly with certain merchants, and could be controlled via apps on one's smartphone. As of April 2021, more than 100,000 have downloaded such apps, which were developed by banks, including six state-owned banks. The digital currency could be spent in stores like Starbucks and McDonald's in China, as well as online shopping platforms like JD.com. Local governments, partnering with private businesses, have distributed more than 150 million RMB as incentive to attract test users of digital RMB and to stimulate consumption.

As of April 2021, testing has been expanded to six additional regions: Shanghai, Hainan, Changsha, Xi'an, Qingdao and Dalian.

At the end of 2021 there were 261 million users in the extended trial who had made US$13.8 billion of transactions  It has also been rolled out for foreign attendees at the 2022 Winter Olympics in Beijing, where it has seen limited use due to entrenched digital currencies and Visa, as well as lack of publicity.

On March 31, 2022, People's Bank of China announced that the testing has been further expanded to six additional regions: Tianjin, Chongqing, Guangzhou, Fuzhou, Xiamen, and six cities in the province of Zhejiang that are hosting the 2022 Asian Games (Hangzhou, Ningbo, Wenzhou, Huzhou, Shaoxing, and Jinhua). Another news statement from PBOC shows that the city of Beijing and Zhangjiakou are also being included on the list of testing after the 2022 Winter Olympics.

On December 16, 2022, the testing of Digital renminbi has been further expanded into five additional regions: Jinan, Fangchenggang, Nanning, Kunming, and Xishuangbanna.

Goals 

The PBOC has stated that the goal of launching digital RMB is to partially replace cash, but not bank deposits or privately run payment platforms. The bank claimed that digital RMB could be used to reduce money laundering, gambling, corruption and terror financing, and may improve the efficiency of financial transactions. The central bank also stated that it would limit how it tracks individuals, through the so-called "controllable anonymity." Critics say that the currency will give the Chinese government a new tool to monitor its people and financial transactions. In 2020, non-cash transactions represented 4 out of 5 payment transactions totaling a sum of 320 trillion yuan.

Li Bo, deputy governor of the PBOC, stated that the "goal is not to replace the U.S. dollar or other international currencies".

Effects

On digital payment platforms 
According to World Bank data, in 2017, almost 20% of Chinese over 15 did not hold a bank account. As of February 2021, 87% of the population have access to fintech apps such as WeChat Pay and Alipay, which together account for more than 90% of electronic payments in China as of 2021.

Chinese fintech apps have largely leapfrogged traditional card-based payment networks in China, due to the fintech apps' ease of use and much cheaper fees for merchants. Transfers within Wechat Pay and Alipay are free within their respective ecosystems, and generally have a 0.1% fee for transfers outside their ecosystem, much lower than the 2–4% fee imposed by credit cards. Wechat Pay and Alipay each have over a billion users in China, and are used by over 90% of the population in China's largest cities as their preferred payment method. The digital yuan might sideline these private digital payment platforms.

Internationally 
The digital RMB could provide a cheaper and more practical alternative to international transactions that are outside the U.S.-led global financial system, especially for countries with strong ties to China. It is feared by U.S. commentators and officials that the digital RMB would weaken the ability of the U.S. to monitor and control the global financial system, through "dollar weaponization," such as sanctions and through its intelligence access to the SWIFT payment system.

Reactions 
Some commentators have said that the U.S., which has only started to consider to issue a government-backed digital currency, risks falling behind China and weakening its dominance in the global financial system. The digital renminbi has been described as a "national-security issue" threatening the US dollar by Josh Lipsky at the Atlantic Council think tank. It is also seen by commentators as a tool to allow Chinese authorities to keep domestic control and surveillance capabilities.

Some argue that the real barriers to internationalisation of the renminbi are China's capital controls, which it has no plans to remove. Maximilian Kärnfelt, an expert at the Mercator Institute for China Studies, said that a digital renminbi "would not banish many of the problems holding the renminbi back from more use globally". He went on to say, "Much of China's financial market is still not open to foreigners and property rights remain fragile." Victor Shih, a China expert and professor at the University of California San Diego, said that merely introducing a digital currency "doesn't solve the problem that some people holding renminbi offshore will want to sell that renminbi and exchange it for the dollar", as the dollar is considered to be a safer asset. Eswar Prasad, an economics professor at Cornell University, said that the digital renminbi "will hardly put a dent in the dollar's status as the dominant global reserve currency" due to the United States' "economic dominance, deep and liquid capital markets, and still-robust institutional framework". The U.S. dollar's share as a reserve currency is above 60%, while that of the renminbi is about 2%.

U.S. Treasury Secretary Janet Yellen and Federal Reserve Chairman Jerome Powell have said that they are studying the effects of digital currencies like the digital RMB and how they will affect the U.S. dollar.

The EU is also considering to issue a digital euro. According to Clingendael Institute, digital currencies such as the digital yuan threaten the growing position of the euro as an alternative to the dollar.

See also 
 Central bank digital currency
 Digital Rupee
 Belt and Road Initiative
 Internationalization of the renminbi

References 

RMB
Renminbi